Monte Vista Hotel is a historic hotel building located at Black Mountain, Buncombe County, North Carolina.  It was built in 1937, and is a three-story, L-shaped Colonial Revival style brick building with a hipped roof. A six-room, one-story addition was built about 1940 that connects, by an enclosed breezeway, to a 16-room, one-story, L-shaped annex added in 1980.  Also on the property is a contributing two-story, frame farmhouse (c. 1926).

It was listed on the National Register of Historic Places in 2008.

References

External links
Monte Vista Hotel website

Hotel buildings on the National Register of Historic Places in North Carolina
Colonial Revival architecture in North Carolina
Hotel buildings completed in 1937
Buildings and structures in Buncombe County, North Carolina
National Register of Historic Places in Buncombe County, North Carolina